Tom is an unincorporated community in McCurtain County, Oklahoma, United States. The post office was established in 1916 and named for Tom Stewart, an early settler. It is the southeasternmost community in Oklahoma, in the midst of the Ouachita National Forest.

Recreation

Further to the west is the Red Slough Wildlife Management Area, which covers 5,814 acres and is managed cooperatively by the Oklahoma Department of Wildlife Conservation, the U.S. Forest Service, and the Natural Resources Conservation Service.

The Red River, a few miles to the south, has generally clear waters and an abundance of giant alligator gar, channel, blue and flathead catfish, and stripped, spotted, white, hybrid and largemouth bass; but there is limited river access.

References

External links

Map: 

Unincorporated communities in McCurtain County, Oklahoma
Unincorporated communities in Oklahoma